Beit Haverim ("House of Friends" in Hebrew) is a French organization for LGBT Jews.

History 
Founded in 1977 by a handful of Ashkenazi Jews, it received help and support from Pastor Joseph Doucé. Since then it has become one of the oldest and most important associations in the French LGBT community .  It is among the founders of Inter-LGBT, an umbrella organization for LGBT groups in France. The association is open to all and all are welcome in a spirit of friendship, tolerance and diversity.

In 2008, the organization opened its headquarters at 5 rue Fénelon, in Paris' 10th arrondissement.

In 2017 the organization celebrated its 40th anniversary by releasing a book. The organization reached out to several French Rabbis to participate, and only Michaël Azoulay accepted. The objective of the book was to present an analysis of the relationship between Homosexuality and Judaism. In April 2017, the organization joined the organization Les «Oublié.es» to remember both the Persecution of homosexuals in Nazi Germany and The Holocaust in France.

Work 
The organization supports its members in accepting their dual identities as Jewish and LGBT and fights to promote the inclusion of LGBT Jews in the larger French Jewish community.

In Paris, Lyon, Montpellier, and Marseille, Beit Haverim organizes diverse activities, including events with Jewish and/or LGBT personalities, discussion forums, as well as a number of social events. The organization is nonpolitical and welcomes people from all political, religious and sexual orientations.

Beit Haverim at Pride Parades

References

See also 

 LGBT and Judaism
 Homosexuels musulmans de France

External links 

 
 Martine Gross « Judaism and Homosexuality
 2012 Interview with Frank Jaoui, spokesperson for Beit Haverim in Genre, sexualité et société]

1977 establishments in France
Jewish organizations based in Europe
Jews and Judaism in Paris
LGBT Jewish organizations
LGBT culture in Paris
LGBT organizations in France
Organizations based in Paris